In Concert may refer to:

Albums
 In Concert (Ahmad Jamal album), 1981
 In Concert (1985 America album)
 In Concert (1995 America album)
 In Concert (Amy Grant album), 1981
 In Concert (Apo Hiking Society album), 1974
 In Concert (Blood, Sweat & Tears album), 1976
 In Concert (Carole King album), 1994
 In Concert (Chet Baker and Lee Konitz album), 1982
 In Concert, by Cinderella, reissue title of Live at the Key Club, 1999
 In Concert (Dave Burrell and David Murray album), 1991
 In Concert (Dead Can Dance album), 2013
 In Concert (Derek and the Dominos album), 1973
 In Concert (The Doors album), 1991
 In Concert (The Dubliners album), 1965
 In Concert (iamamiwhoami album), 2010
 In Concert (Janis Joplin album), 1972
 In Concert (Jethro Tull album), 1995
 In Concert (John Hicks album), 1986
 In Concert (Kenny Drew album), 1979
 In Concert (Miles Davis album), 1973
 In Concert (Oregon album), 1975
 In Concert (Peter, Paul and Mary album), 1964
 In Concert (Rockapella album), 2001
 In Concert (Sérgio Mendes album), 1969
 In Concert (Sherbet album), 1975
 In Concert 1972, by Ravi Shankar and Ali Akbar Khan, 1973
 In Concert 1987: Abigail, by King Diamond, 1991
 In Concert at the Outpost Performance Space, Albuquerque 2004, by Kenny Davern, 2005
 In Concert at the Troubadour, 1969, an album by Rick Nelson, 1970
 In Concert on Broadway, by Harry Connick Jr., 2011
 In Concert with The London Symphony Orchestra, 2000
 In Concert, November 1975 (Richard & Linda Thompson album), 2007
 In Concert, Zürich, October 28, 1979, by Chick Corea, 1980
 In Concert – Brandeis University 1963, by Bob Dylan, 2011
 In Concert-Carnegie Hall, by George Benson, 1976
 In Concert – Live at Sibelius Hall, by Tarja Turunen & Harus, 2011
 In Concert: A Benefit for the Crossroads Centre at Antigua, by Eric Clapton & Friends, 1999
 In Concert: Merchants of Cool, by Bad Company, 2002
 In Concert: The Party's Just Begun Tour, by the Cheetah Girls, 2007
 In Concert/MTV Plugged, by Bruce Springsteen, 1993

Similar titles
 The Beach Boys in Concert, 1973
 David Gilmour in Concert, 2002
 Deep Purple in Concert, 1980
 Donovan in Concert, 1968
 Rising (Donovan album), 1990; released as Donovan in Concert, 1994
 Emerson, Lake & Palmer in Concert, 1979
 In Concert Volume Two (Amy Grant album), 1981
 In Concert Volume Two (Freddie Hubbard & Stanley Turrentine album), 1973
 Strawbs in Concert
 Jane Olivor in Concert, by Jane Olivor, 1982

Television
 In Concert (American TV series), a 1972 late-night music program
 In Concert (Canadian TV series), a 1981 music concert series
 "In Concert" (WKRP in Cincinnati), an episode

Other uses
 In Concert, a CBC Radio 2 classical music program
 In Concert, a 1989 book by Carl Vigeland
 In Concert 1980, a 1980 concert tour by Mike Oldfield